Potassium bis(trimethylsilyl)amide (commonly abbreviated as KHMDS, Potassium(K) HexaMethylDiSilazide) or potassium hexamethyldisilazane is the chemical compound with the formula ((CH3)3Si)2NK. It is a strong, non-nucleophilic base with an approximate pKa of 26 (compare to lithium diisopropylamide, at 36).

Structure
In the solid state, the unsolvated compound is dimeric, with two potassium and two nitrogen atoms forming a square. This compound is soluble in hydrocarbon solvents and conducts electricity poorly in solution and in the melt. This is attributed to very strong ion pairing.

See also
 Metal bis(trimethylsilyl)amides

References

Bis(trimethylsilyl)amides
Potassium compounds
Non-nucleophilic bases